Below are the rosters for the UNCAF Nations Cup 1991 tournament in San José, Costa Rica, from May 26 to June 2, 1991.

Head coach::  Rolando Villalobos

Head coach:  Haroldo Cordón

Head coach:  Flavio Ortega

Head coach:  Oscar Benitez

References

RSSSF Archive

Copa Centroamericana squads